Bertmainius tumidus is a spider in the family Migidae. It was first described in 2015 by Mark Harvey, Barbara York Main, Michael Rix and Steven Cooper, and is endemic to South-western Australia.

References

Migidae
Spiders of Australia
Spiders described in 2015